Twemlow is a civil parish in Cheshire East, England.  It contains nine buildings that are recorded in the National Heritage List for England as designated listed buildings.  Of these, one is listed at Grade II*, the middle of the three grades, and the others are at Grade II, the lowest grade.  Apart from the village of Twemlow Green, the parish is rural.  The listed buildings, other than one, are two country houses, one of which has been converted into a school, and structures associated with them.  The exception is a timber-framed cottage that has been moved from elsewhere. Twemlow Viaduct, part of which is in the parish, is listed under Holmes Chapel.


Key

Buildings

See also

Listed buildings in Holmes Chapel
Listed buildings in Goostrey
Listed buildings in Lower Withington
Listed buildings in Swettenham
Listed buildings in Brereton
Listed buildings in Cranage

References
Citations

Sources

 

Listed buildings in the Borough of Cheshire East
Lists of listed buildings in Cheshire